NA-103 Faisalabad-IX is a constituency for the National Assembly of Pakistan.

Members of Parliament

2018-2022: NA-107 Faisalabad-VII

Election 2002 

General elections were held on 10 Oct 2002. Mushtaq Ali Cheema of PML-Q won by 38,278 votes.

Election 2008 

General elections were held on 18 Feb 2008. Muhammad Ijaz Virk of Pakistan Peoples Party Parliamentarian (PPPP) won by 56,910 votes.

Election 2013 

Election Proceedings Terminated under section 18 of the Representation of the people Act 1976 due to the death of a contesting Candidate.

Election 2018 
General elections were held on 25 July 2018.

By-election 2023 
A by-election will be held on 19 March 2023 due to the resignation of Khurram Shehzad, the previous MNA from this seat.

See also
NA-102 Faisalabad-VIII
NA-104 Faisalabad-X

References

External links
 Election result's official website
 Detail Result of Constituency Election 2002 NA 83 Faisalabad   IX

NA-083